Isaiah Dwayne Buggs (born August 24, 1996) is an American football defensive tackle for the Detroit Lions of the National Football League (NFL). He played college football at Alabama.

Early years
Buggs attended and played high school football at Ruston High School in Ruston, Louisiana.

College career
Buggs played at Mississippi Gulf Coast Community College in 2015 and 2016. During the two years he had 134 tackles and 7.5 sacks. In 2017, he transferred to the University of Alabama. During his first year at Alabama in 2017, Buggs started 13 of 14 games, recording 51 tackles and 1.5 sacks. He had five tackles in the 2018 College Football Playoff National Championship victory over Georgia. He returned to Alabama in 2018.

Professional career

Pittsburgh Steelers
Buggs was selected by the Pittsburgh Steelers in the sixth round (192nd overall) of the 2019 NFL Draft. In his rookie season, he appeared in eight games and recorded three total tackles. He was placed on the reserve/COVID-19 list by the team on November 27, 2020, and activated three days later. He was released by the Steelers on January 8, 2022.

Las Vegas Raiders
On January 17, 2022, Buggs was signed to the Las Vegas Raiders practice squad.

Detroit Lions
On July 22, 2022, Buggs signed with the Detroit Lions. He played in all 17 games with 13 starts, recording 46 tackles, two passes defensed, and a forced fumble.

On March 13, 2023, Buggs signed a two-year, $6 million contract extension with the Lions.

References

External links
Pittsburgh Steelers bio
Alabama Crimson Tide bio

1996 births
Living people
Sportspeople from Ruston, Louisiana
Players of American football from Louisiana
American football defensive ends
Mississippi Gulf Coast Bulldogs football players
Alabama Crimson Tide football players
Pittsburgh Steelers players
Las Vegas Raiders players
Detroit Lions players